Karl Martin Sandberg (born 26 February 1971), known professionally as Max Martin, is a Swedish record producer and songwriter. He rose to prominence in the late 1990s making a string of hit singles such as Britney Spears's "...Baby One More Time" (1998), the Backstreet Boys' "I Want It That Way" (1999), Céline Dion's  "That's the Way It Is" (1999)  and NSYNC's "It's Gonna Be Me" (2000).

Martin has written or co-written 25 Billboard Hot 100 number-one songs, most of which he has also produced or co-produced, including Katy Perry's "I Kissed a Girl" (2008) and "Roar" (2013), Maroon 5's "One More Night" (2012), Taylor Swift's "Shake It Off" and "Blank Space" (2014), and The Weeknd's "Blinding Lights" (2019) and "Save Your Tears" (2020). Martin is the songwriter with the third-most number-one singles on the chart, behind only Paul McCartney (32) and John Lennon (26). In addition, he is tied with George Martin for the most Hot 100 number-one songs as a producer, with 23 as of 2021.  Some of Martin's biggest hits were used in the 2019 jukebox musical & Juliet.

In early 2019, his single sales were tallied by The Hollywood Reporter to be at over $135 million. According to Variety, his net worth was approximately $260 million in 2017. The previous year his corporate entity generated revenue of $54 million, with a profit of $19 million.

Martin has won the ASCAP Songwriter of the Year award a record eleven times. He has also received five Grammy Awards, including Producer of the Year, and nominations for an Academy Award and two Golden Globe Awards.

Life and career

Early career and It's Alive
Sandberg was born and grew up in Stenhamra, Ekerö Municipality, Stockholm County. His mother was a middle school teacher and his father was a police officer. As a child, Martin was a student of Sweden's public music-education scheme, and once said he had "public music education to thank for everything".

As a teenager he sang in a variety of bands before joining a glam-style metal band called It's Alive in 1985 as their singer and frontman. It's Alive was formed by ex-Lazy members Per Aldeheim and Kim Björkgren on guitars, and John Rosth who had been a member of Lineout. Martin eventually dropped out of high school to pursue a career in music with his band under the nickname "Martin White". In 1988 It's Alive participated in "Rock-SM", a nationwide talent contest, and had a residency at a nightclub in Cyprus. The band got a breakthrough in 1991, as Dave Constable of Megarock Records offered them to make a demo record. The later debut album was originally pressed in 1,000 copies and later on given away as a free cover tape in the UK by the Metal Forces magazine.

The decision to focus on a music career paid off as they landed a record deal on producer Denniz PoP's label Cheiron Records, a BMG affiliate. After recording their second album Earthquake Visions, they released three singles in conjunction with the record and toured through Europe in 1994 supporting Kingdom Come. Earthquake Visions eventually sold a disappointing 30,000 copies, despite being released in as many as 30 countries. More importantly though, Martin also began collaborating on songs with PoP. Recognizing a talent for writing pop songs in the young rocker, PoP renamed his new protégé Max Martin and eventually became Martin's mentor.

Working with Cheiron and Denniz PoP

In 1993, Martin was hired by Cheiron Studios and spent some time learning the basics, before the first production collaboration between PoP and Martin: the Rednex song "Wish You Were Here" in 1994. They both worked on Ace of Base's second album, The Bridge (1995), shortly thereafter, as well as on albums by 3T, Army of Lovers and Leila K. To date, The Bridge has sold more than six million copies worldwide, including one million in the United States. When Martin eventually left his band It's Alive in late 1995, he was replaced by Anders Hansson.

In 1995, Cheiron Studios was hired by Zomba to work on Backstreet Boys' self-titled debut album Backstreet Boys (1996). Zomba became the main working partner since the success in 1995. Martin took part in the production of "Quit Playing Games (with My Heart)" (1996), co-written with Herbie Crichlow, a single which quickly went platinum and climbed to No. 2 on the Billboard Hot 100, as well as the singles "As Long As You Love Me" (1997) and "Everybody (Backstreet's Back)" (1997). The album was not released in the U.S. until 1997, but was released overseas and caught on all across Europe, eventually selling around 8 million copies worldwide. This led to the Backstreet Boys being relaunched in their home country later on, this time more successfully. Later that year, Martin co-wrote and co-produced Robyn's hits "Show Me Love" and "Do You Know (What It Takes)" which ended up on the Billboard Hot 100 top 10.

In 1998, Cheiron Productions worked on albums by Five and Jessica Folcker. Jessica Folcker had first been hired as a backing singer for tracks with Ace of Base and Dr. Alban, and her debut album Jessica became an instant hit with singles like "Tell Me What You Like" and "How Will I Know Who You Are" which both sold platinum. After Denniz PoP died of cancer that same summer, Martin took over as director of Cheiron Studios. He soon started working with writer/producer Rami Yacoub, who continued to be his partner for many years. Martin also wrote two songs with Bryan Adams during this time, "Cloud Number Nine" and "Before The Night Is Over".

In late 1999, Celine Dion released "That's the Way It Is", a song co-written by Max Martin to promote her greatest hits album All the Way... A Decade of Song. The song became a hit, going to number 1 on the adult contemporary charts in the United States and Canada, and reaching top 10 all over the world. Since the song was released in November 1999, it has cycled 500,000 times on almost 1400 radio stations across Canada and the U.S.
In 2003 Martin co-wrote and produced three songs for Dion's album One Heart. One of them, called "Faith", was released in 2003 as a promotional single in Canada and reached number 4 on the Quebec Airplay Chart and number 37 on the Canadian Adult Contemporary Chart.

Martin, Andreas Carlsson, and Rami Yacoub wrote Westlife's song "I Need You" for the first Westlife album Westlife (1999). Martin, Nick Jarl, Steve Mac, and Patric Jonsson wrote Westlife's song "You Make Me Feel" for their second album Coast to Coast (2000). Max Martin, Rami Yacoub, and Andreas Carlsson also wrote one of Westlife's hits, "When You're Looking Like That", for their second album Coast to Coast (2000).

Backstreet Boys
Martin wrote, co-wrote, and co-produced 7 out of the 12 songs on the Backstreet Boys' third album Millennium (1999), including all the singles. "I Want It That Way", a hit song Martin co-wrote with Andreas Carlsson and co-produced with Kristian Lundin, became the group's biggest single to date and it is still popular today. ("I Want It That Way" was voted No. 10 in the MTV/Rolling Stone list of the "100 Greatest Pop Songs".) 100 Greatest Songs of the '90s, a VH1 special, ranked the song at number 3, making it the highest ranked boy-band single and pop song. Millennium sold over 1.1 million units in its first week in the United States, setting a record for most albums sold in its debut week (that record was later beaten by NSYNC's 2000 album No Strings Attached), and was the best-selling album in the world.

When working on her own solo album, to be released in 2001 on Stockholm Records, Lisa Miskovsky wrote the lyrics for the Backstreet Boys' hit single "Shape of My Heart" with Max Martin and Rami. The song, originally written for Miskovsky's own album, was passed on to the Backstreet Boys by Max Martin when Miskovsky decided that it did not fit her style. The song became the first single off the group's fourth album Black & Blue (2000). In the first week of release, "Shape of My Heart" immediately jumped into the Top Five in Sweden, Norway, Canada, Germany and another 15 countries. Black & Blue, containing several songs produced and written by Martin, sold 1.6 million units in its first week in America. Martin again received ASCAP's award "Songwriter of the Year" both in 2000 and 2001. In April 2013 the Backstreet Boys member Brian Littrell invited Martin to collaborate on their single "In A World Like This". The single peaked at No.6 in the Oricon chart and performed well in the rest of the world. Martin collaborated on the Never Gone songs "Climbing the Walls", "Just Want You to Know", "Siberia" and "I Still...". Martin wanted the album to be more of a contemporary, alternative pop album with a little R&B. The resulting album had a more organic music style with more live instruments, and was a departure from the Backstreet Boys' earlier work.

Britney Spears

In 1998, Martin wrote and co-produced Spears' debut single, "...Baby One More Time", for her debut album of the same name. The single was originally offered to the Backstreet Boys and TLC, though both passed on the song. That same year, Martin also co-wrote and co-produced the third single "(You Drive Me) Crazy". By 1999, the album ...Baby One More Time had sold over 15 million copies in the U.S., certifying Diamond Status. Also, within a year of its release, ...Baby One More Time had become the best-selling LP by a teenager in history, selling over 30 million copies. Martin was the first non-American citizen ever to win ASCAP's prestigious award "Songwriter of the Year" in 1999, an award he also won in 2000 and 2001.

Martin worked on Spears's follow-up records Oops!... I Did It Again (2000) and Britney (2001). He co-wrote and co-produced the singles "Oops!... I Did It Again" (2000), "Lucky" (2000), "Stronger" (2000), "Overprotected" (2001), and "I'm Not a Girl, Not Yet a Woman" (2002). The duo ended up parting ways when Spears distanced herself from teen pop. Spears recorded In the Zone (2003) and Blackout (2007). At the request of Spears, Martin produced and wrote for Spears' sixth studio album Circus (2008). Martin co-wrote and produced the provocatively titled electro pop song, "If U Seek Amy", which was chosen by fans to be the third single of the album. Martin then produced the number one hit, "3", for Spears' compilation album The Singles Collection (2009).

Martin was one of the executive producers of Spears's seventh album, Femme Fatale (2011). He produced several songs for the album, including the successful singles "Hold It Against Me", "Till the World Ends", "I Wanna Go", and "Criminal".

Startup of Maratone
Following the death of Denniz PoP, Cheiron Studios was closed down in 2000. Martin and Tom Talomaa then started a new production company named Maratone in January 2001 and moved into the famous Cosmos Studios building. The first songs to be written and produced at Maratone were four tracks for Britney Spears's album Britney (2001). The Maratone production crew initially consisted of producers/songwriters Max Martin, Rami, Alexandra, Arnthor Birgisson and Shellback. Following the work with Celine Dion on the album One Heart in 2003, few new hits appeared from Maratone until 2005.

In 2004, Kelly Clarkson traveled to Sweden to collaborate with Martin and Dr. Luke on her second studio album, Breakaway. These collaborations resulted in the rock-influenced singles "Since U Been Gone" (2004) and "Behind These Hazel Eyes" (2005). In 2009, Martin co-wrote Clarkson's single "My Life Would Suck Without You", which was a number one hit.

In 2005, Martin collaborated with the Norwegian singer Marion Raven for the release of her debut album, titled Here I Am, writing and co-writing the songs "Break You", "End of Me", "Here I Am", "Little By Little", "In Spite of Me", and "Six Feet Under".

Pink
Martin co-wrote and produced three songs on Pink's platinum-selling album I'm Not Dead, including the singles, "U + Ur Hand" (2006), "Who Knew" (2006), and "Cuz I Can" (2007). Martin also collaborated with Pink for her next album, Funhouse (2008). Martin co-wrote the first smash hit single, "So What" (2008), plus the singles "Please Don't Leave Me" (2009) and "I Don't Believe You" (2009). The duo wrote "Whataya Want From Me" during the sessions for Funhouse, but ultimately the song was recorded and released as a single by Adam Lambert. Later, Martin co-wrote hits for Pink including "Raise Your Glass" (2010), "Fuckin' Perfect" (2011), and "Just like Fire" (2016), for various Pink-related projects. For her seventh studio album, Beautiful Trauma (2017), he co-wrote "Revenge", "Whatever You Want", "For Now", and "Secrets". In 2019, for her eighth studio album, Hurts 2B Human (2019), he co-wrote "(Hey Why) Miss You Sometime".

Usher
In 2010, Martin co-wrote and co-produced Usher's song "DJ Got Us Fallin' in Love" that went number-one on the US Rhythmic charts and top-ten on the main Hot 100. Working together again, Martin co-wrote and co-produced on Usher's seventh studio album "Looking 4 Myself" in 2012 making the dance-pop song "Scream" that went number-one on the US Dance Club Songs chart and number nine on the US Billboard Hot 100 chart. It was certified platinum by the Recording Industry Association of America (RIAA).

Avril Lavigne
Martin worked with Avril Lavigne on two songs, "Alone" and "I Will Be", which were released on some deluxe editions of Lavigne's third studio album The Best Damn Thing (2007). Martin also worked on four songs for Lavigne's fourth studio album Goodbye Lullaby (2011): the three singles "What the Hell" (2011), "Smile" (2011), and "Wish You Were Here" (2011), and the album track "I Love You".

Jessie J
Max Martin first worked with Jessie J on her international hit "Domino", which achieved top ten success in countries including Canada and Australia. Following the success of "Domino", Martin co-produced "Bang Bang" (2014) for Jessie J,  Ariana Grande and Nicki Minaj.

Katy Perry
Max Martin is also responsible for some of the songs of Katy Perry on four albums: On her debut album One of the Boys (2008), including the number-one single "I Kissed a Girl", and top 5 hit single "Hot n Cold", and following-up album Teenage Dream (2010), including the Billboard Hot 100 numbers-one hit singles "California Gurls" (2010), "Teenage Dream" (2010), "E.T." (2011),"Last Friday Night (T.G.I.F.)" (2011) and the Hot 100 top ten hit "The One That Got Away" (2011). Martin also co-wrote the songs "Part of Me" (2012) and "Wide Awake" (2012), the former of which topped the Billboard Hot 100. For her third album Prism (2013), he co-wrote the No. 1 singles "Roar" (2013) and "Dark Horse" (2013). On her fourth album Witness (2017), Martin co-wrote numerous songs, including the lead single "Chained to the Rhythm" which peaked at number 4.

Christina Aguilera
Confirmed by RCA Executives on 18 December 2011, Martin worked on Christina Aguilera's seventh studio album Lotus (2012) and was the producer of her lead single, "Your Body" (2012), as well as another song titled "Let There Be Love". Both songs reached the top of the Billboard dance/club chart.

Taylor Swift
Martin has collaborated with American singer-songwriter Taylor Swift on three of her albums. Their first collaboration was the Billboard Hot 100 number 1 hit "We Are Never Ever Getting Back Together" (2012) for her album Red (2012). Martin also co-wrote and produced two other singles on the album: "I Knew You Were Trouble" (2012), which peaked at number 2 on the Billboard Hot 100, and "22" (2013).

Martin also contributed to her follow-up record, 1989 (2014). He co-wrote and co-produced the singles "Shake It Off", "Blank Space", "Bad Blood", "Wildest Dreams", "Style", and "New Romantics", among other songs. Three of the songs reached number one on the Billboard Hot 100.

Martin later worked with Swift on Reputation (2017), co-writing and co-producing eight songs, including the singles "...Ready for It?", "End Game", and "Delicate".

Swift released her second re-recorded album Red (Taylor's Version) (2021). He co-wrote three re-recorded songs, including "We Are Never Ever Getting Back Together", "I Knew You Were Trouble", and "22 ". He didn’t handle the production of the re-recorded songs. He also co-wrote a song called "Message in a Bottle", one of the newly added "From the Vault" tracks.

Ariana Grande
Martin first worked with Ariana Grande on her second studio album My Everything (2014). Martin produced the first single, "Problem", which peaked at No. 2 on the Billboard Hot 100 as well as No. 1 in the UK, later becoming one of the best-selling singles worldwide. Other songs from the album Martin produced include "Break Free" (peaking at No. 4 on the Billboard Hot 100) and "Bang Bang" (peaking at No. 3 on the Billboard Hot 100 and No. 1 in the UK). Martin contributed heavily to her third studio album, Dangerous Woman (2016), most notably the singles "Dangerous Woman", "Into You", and "Side to Side", all of which peaked within the top twenty on the Billboard Hot 100. Martin also contributed to her follow-up records Sweetener (2018) and Thank U Next (2019), co-writing the singles "No Tears Left to Cry", "God Is a Woman", and "Break Up with Your Girlfriend, I'm Bored", among other songs.

The Weeknd
Martin co-wrote and produced three songs from The Weeknd's sophomore album, Beauty Behind the Madness (2015), namely  "Can't Feel My Face"—which peaked at number one on the Billboard Hot 100—"In the Night" and "Shameless". He co-wrote and produced four songs from The Weeknd's third album, Starboy (2016). He contributed "Hardest to Love", "Scared to Live", "Blinding Lights", "In Your Eyes", and "Save Your Tears" to The Weeknd's fourth studio album, After Hours (2020). The latter album was both a critical and commercial success.

Martin also co-wrote and assisted in the production of Take My Breath, released in August 2021.

Coldplay
Martin appeared as a keyboardist on two singles from Coldplay's eighth studio album Everyday Life (2019): "Orphans" and "Champion of the World". In June 2021, Coldplay announced their ninth studio album Music of the Spheres (2021), with Martin serving as the album's producer. The album received mixed reviews from critics but was a commercial success, debuting at the top of the UK Albums Chart and becoming the album with most sales in a week in the United Kingdom since Ed Sheeran's No.6 Collaborations Project (2019).

Music of the Spheres (2021) included songs such as "Higher Power", "Let Somebody Go", which Selena Gomez appears on, and "My Universe", which BTS appears on. "My Universe" debuted at number one on the Billboard Hot 100, giving Martin his twenty fifth number one as a writer and twenty third number one as a producer on the chart. He is tied only with George Martin for producer with most Billboard Hot 100 number ones.

Others
Martin co-wrote "It's My Life" with fellow Songwriters Hall of Fame inductees Jon Bon Jovi and Richie Sambora. It was released on 8 May 2000 as the lead single from Bon Jovi's seventh studio album, Crush (2000). The song was certified 2× platinum in the United States; platinum in Austria, Australia, Belgium, Germany, Italy, Sweden, Switzerland, and the United Kingdom; and gold in France, Japan, and the Netherlands. 

Fourth runner-up of the eighth season of American Idol, Allison Iraheta has collaborated with Martin on her debut album. Her first single, "Friday I'll Be Over U" was written by Martin.
On 17 August 2009, American Idol runner-up Adam Lambert announced via Twitter that he was in New York City with Martin recording a song for his debut album. It turned out to be the song "Whataya Want From Me", that was also written by P!nk.

Martin also co-wrote "Into the Nightlife", a popular club track recorded by Cyndi Lauper in 2008 and produced, alongside Zedd, and co-wrote "Beauty and a Beat", on Justin Bieber's 2012 album Believe.

Martin also produced several albums for Eurodance act E-type.

In 2005, Max Martin wrote the first single-song for pop punk duo The Veronicas, "4ever", with Lukasz "Dr. Luke" Gottwald for their debut studio album The Secret Life Of... (2005). Also he wrote "Everything I'm Not", the second single-song of The Veronicas, the same year, again with Gottwald, Rami, Jessica Origliasso and Lisa Origliasso for the same album The Secret Life Of....

In January 2014, Martin produced a two-minute advertisement entitled "Volvo XC70: Made By Sweden", featuring soccer player Zlatan Ibrahimović. The video of the advertisement received several million views on YouTube.

2008 saw him collaborate with Daughtry (band) for one of their singles from their 2006 debut album Daughtry (album): their 2008 single Feels Like Tonight written with Dr. Luke.

In early 2014, Martin co-wrote the song "Dare (La La La)" for Shakira's self-titled album.

In April–May 2014, Martin produced Jennifer Lopez's song "First Love", alongside Ilya, Shellback and Savan Kotecha.

Between 2014 and 2015, Martin executive-produced "Ghost Town" by Adam Lambert.

In January 2015, he co-wrote and co-produced Ellie Goulding's "Love Me like You Do", which reached number 3 on the Billboard Hot 100, while also producing several songs from her album Delirium including the hit single "On My Mind", which was released on 17 September 2015.

In July 2015, Martin produced Demi Lovato's song "Cool for the Summer" which reached number 11 on the Billboard Hot 100. He also contributed to "Confident" and "For You" from their fifth studio album Confident.

Martin also worked with Selena Gomez on her second studio album, Revival, producing its third single "Hands to Myself" which became her third consecutive top 10 hit from the album.

In November 2015, Adele's album 25 was released and Martin co-wrote and co-produced the record's third single "Send My Love (To Your New Lover)" with Shellback, and would eventually become a top 10 hit in the US and the UK.

2016 saw Martin being heavily involved in the making of Ariana Grande's third album Dangerous Woman, with half of its songs (including both singles) being produced by him. The same year, he produced the 10th track for Nick Jonas' third studio album, while also co-producing standalone songs for American singers Pink ("Just Like Fire") and Katy Perry ("Rise").

In 2016, he co-wrote the song "Can't Stop the Feeling!" by Justin Timberlake which is also the title song for the film Trolls with Shellback. The song became Timberlake's fifth and Martin's twenty-second number-one hit in the US. It reached the top spot in 16 other countries. The song gave Timberlake and Martin their first nomination for an Academy Award for Best Original Song.

In 2019, Max Martin co-produced and co-wrote Ed Sheeran's and Justin Bieber's hit single "I Don't Care".

In 2020, Max Martin co-produced and co-wrote "Stupid Love", the first single extracted from Lady Gaga's sixth studio album Chromatica. This marks the first time the two have worked together.

In 2022, Max Martin co-produced and co-wrote Måneskin's single "Supermodel". He also co-produced and co-wrote Lizzo's song "2 Be Loved (Am I Ready)", from her fourth studio album, Special.

Artistry

Influences
When accepting the Polar Music Prize, Martin highlighted ABBA, Kiss, Prince and Lasse Holm as inspirations.

Creative process
The traditional division of work in the record industry often has the artist or songwriter writing the songs and then hiring a producer to help shape the sound. But at Cheiron, it was the other way around; the producers wrote the songs, played the instruments, and engineered and mixed the recordings, and the artist was only brought in near the end of the process to do the vocals. For example, on Britney Spears's second album Oops!… I Did It Again (2000), Cheiron had already written seven songs and had proceeded to record the layers of music before Britney even arrived at the studios in early November 1999. It took her only one week to do the vocals. Martin and his team worked more like a band that alternated singers. Martin explained his working method:

Impact and legacy
Martin's influence on the music field is also seen in the effect he has had on co-producers. The music site Stereogum singles out three people as his "disciples", Savan Kotecha, Dr. Luke, and Shellback. Time magazine reported that "There's a cluster of high-powered songwriters who are based in Sweden, and the grandmaster is Max Martin and that when Kotecha worked with One Direction he credited Martin's influence 'We work melody first. That's Max Martin's school. We’ll spend days, sometimes weeks, challenging the melody. The goal is to make it sound like anyone can do this, but it's actually very difficult. In Sweden, you don’t do anything until you do it right.'" The New Yorker reported that Martin was Dr. Luke's "Swedish mentor and frequent collaborator. If Luke is the Skywalker of pop songcraft, Max is the Obi-Wan: the reclusive master. ...The vital spark in the musical emergence of Dr. Luke was meeting Max Martin". Dr. Luke himself says of the chemistry between him and Martin "'It happened really fast. It was magical. …[Martin taught me that] Instead of making tracks for five thousand people, why not make tracks for a million?'" The magazine for Sweden's collection society STIM reported that Shellback became an "apprentice" with Martin acting as "his mentor" at Maratone Studios after 2006 when "Max Martin saw something special in the young man from Karlshamn. Judging by the incredible success Shellback has had since, Martin's A&R skills are some of the best in the music business".

Martin's song catalog was used in the stage musical & Juliet, which opened on the West End in 2019.

Personal life
Martin met his wife, Jenny (née Petersson) from Mörrum, around 2000 and they married in 2011. The couple have a daughter, born around 2001.

Martin lives in Los Angeles and in Stockholm.

Songwriting and production

Billboard Hot 100 number-one singles
Since 1998, Martin has written or co-written 25 Billboard Hot 100 number-one hit songs (most of which he has also produced or co-produced). Six of these songs debuted at number one on the chart.

 1998 – "...Baby One More Time" by Britney Spears
 2000 – "It's Gonna Be Me" by NSYNC
 2008 – "I Kissed a Girl" by Katy Perry
 2008 – "So What" by Pink
 2009 – "My Life Would Suck Without You" by Kelly Clarkson
 2009 – "3" by Britney Spears
 2010 – "California Gurls" by Katy Perry featuring Snoop Dogg
 2010 – "Teenage Dream" by Katy Perry
 2010 – "Raise Your Glass" by Pink
  2011 – "Hold It Against Me" by Britney Spears
  2011 – "E.T." by Katy Perry featuring Kanye West
 2011 – "Last Friday Night (T.G.I.F.)" by Katy Perry
 2012 – "Part of Me" by Katy Perry
 2012 – "One More Night" by Maroon 5
 2012 – "We Are Never Ever Getting Back Together" by Taylor Swift
 2013 – "Roar" by Katy Perry
 2013 – "Dark Horse" by Katy Perry featuring Juicy J
 2014 – "Shake It Off" by Taylor Swift
 2014 – "Blank Space" by Taylor Swift
 2015 – "Bad Blood" by Taylor Swift featuring Kendrick Lamar
 2015 – "Can't Feel My Face" by The Weeknd
 2016 – "Can't Stop the Feeling!" by Justin Timberlake
 2019 – "Blinding Lights" by The Weeknd
 2021 – "Save Your Tears" by The Weeknd and Ariana Grande
 2021 – "My Universe" by Coldplay and BTS

Awards and nominations

Academy Awards 

|-
| style="text-align:center;"| 2017
|| "Can't Stop the Feeling!"
|| Best Original Song
|

ASCAP Pop Music Awards

Golden Globe Awards 

|-
| style="text-align:center;"| 2016
| "Love Me Like You Do"
| rowspan="2" | Best Original Song
| 
|-
| style="text-align:center;"| 2017
| "Can't Stop the Feeling!"
|

Grammy Awards

!Ref.
|-
|rowspan=3|2000
|rowspan=2|"I Want It That Way"
|Record of the Year
|
|rowspan=25|
|-
|Song of the Year
|
|-
|Millennium
|rowspan=2|Album of the Year
|
|-
|2011
|Teenage Dream
|
|-
|2013
|"We Are Never Ever Getting Back Together"
|Record of the Year
|
|-
|rowspan=2|2014
|Red
|Album of the Year
|
|-
|"Roar"
|Song of the Year
|
|-
|rowspan=3|2015
|rowspan=2|"Shake It Off"
|Record of the Year
|
|-
|Song of the Year
|
|-
|Self
|Producer of the Year, Non-Classical
|
|-
|rowspan=7|2016
|"Can't Feel My Face"
|rowspan=2|Record of the Year
|
|-
|rowspan=2|"Blank Space"
|
|-
|Song of the Year
|
|-
|Beauty Behind the Madness
|rowspan=2|Album of the Year
|
|-
|rowspan=2|1989
|
|-
|Best Pop Vocal Album
|
|-
|"Love Me like You Do"
|rowspan=3|Best Song Written for Visual Media
|
|-
|rowspan=4|2017
|"Can't Stop the Feeling!"
|
|-
|"Just like Fire"
|
|-
|25
|Album of the Year
|
|-
|Self
|Producer of the Year, Non-Classical
|
|-
|2020
|Thank U, Next
|rowspan=4|Album of the Year
|
|-
|rowspan=3|2023
|30
|
|-
|Special
|
|-
|Music of the Spheres
|

Polar Music Prize

!Ref.
|-
|2016
|Self
|Polar Music Prize
|Honoree
|

|-
| style="text-align:center;"| 1996
| Denniz PoP & Max Martin
| Swedish Dance Music Awards 1996 – Best Producers
| 
|-
| style="text-align:center;"| 1997
| Denniz PoP & Max Martin
| Grammis Awards – Special Jury Prize
| 
|-
| style="text-align:center;"| 2010
| Max Martin
| STIM Platinum Guitar
| 
|-
| style="text-align:center;"| 2016
| Max Martin
| Polar Music Prize
| 
|-

See also
Swedish pop music

References

External links

Maratone

1971 births
Living people
Musicians from Stockholm
Swedish record producers
Swedish songwriters
Grammy Award winners
21st-century Swedish musicians
People from Ekerö Municipality
Swedish expatriates in the United States
Musikförläggarnas pris winners